The Wake is a 2005 Greek drama film directed by Nikos Grammatikos. It was entered into the 28th Moscow International Film Festival.

Cast
 Vangelis Mourikis as Andreas
 Michalis Tsourounakis as Nikos
 Aggeliki Dimitrakopoulou
 Iro Loupi as Maria
 Ersi Malikenzou
 Evagelia Samiotaki
 Dimitra Hatoupi as Adrianna

References

External links
 

2005 films
2005 drama films
Greek drama films
2000s Greek-language films